A menstrual cup is a menstrual hygiene device which is inserted into the vagina during menstruation. Its purpose is to collect menstrual fluid (blood from the uterine lining mixed with other fluids). Menstrual cups are usually made of flexible medical grade silicone, latex, or a thermoplastic isomer. They are shaped like a bell with a stem or a ring. The stem is used for insertion and removal, and the bell-shaped cup seals against the vaginal wall just below the cervix and collects menstrual fluid. This is unlike tampons and menstrual pads, which absorb the fluid instead.

Every 4–12 hours (depending on the amount of flow), the cup is removed, emptied, rinsed, and reinserted. After each period, the cup requires cleaning. One cup may be reusable for up to 10 years, making their long-term cost lower than that of disposable tampons or pads, though the initial cost is higher. As menstrual cups are reusable, they generate less solid waste than tampons and pads, both from the products themselves and from their packaging. Most menstrual cup brands sell a smaller and a larger size. Some menstrual cups are sold colorless and translucent, but several brands also offer colored cups.

Menstrual cups typically do not leak if used properly, though incorrect placement or inadequate cup size can cause some women to experience leakage. Menstrual cups are a safe alternative to other menstrual products; risk of toxic shock syndrome infection is similar or less with menstrual cups compared to pads or tampons.

Use 

The menstrual cup is first folded or pinched and then inserted into the vagina. It will normally unfold automatically and create a light seal against the cervix. In some cases, the user may need to twist the cup or flex the vaginal muscles to ensure the cup is fully open. If correctly inserted, the cup should not leak or cause any discomfort. The stem should be completely inside the vagina. If it is not, the stem can be trimmed. There are various folding techniques for insertion; common folds include the c-fold, as well as the punch-down fold.

If lubrication is necessary for insertion, it should be water-based, as silicone lubricant can be damaging to the silicone.

After 4–12 hours of use (depending on the amount of flow), the cup is removed by reaching up to its stem to find the base. Simply pulling on the stem is not recommended to remove the cup, as this can create suction. The base of the cup is pinched to release the seal, and the cup is removed. After emptying, a menstrual cup should be rinsed or wiped and reinserted. It can be washed with a mild soap, and sterilized in boiling water for a few minutes at the end of the cycle. Alternatively, sterilizing solutions (usually developed for baby bottles and breast pump equipment) may be used to soak the cup. Specific cleaning instructions vary by brand.

Advantages
 When using a menstrual cup, the menstrual fluid is collected after it flows from the cervix and is held in liquid form. With tampons, liquid is absorbed and held in semi-coagulated form against the cervix.
 If a user needs to track the amount of menses produced (e.g., for medical reasons), a menstrual cup allows one to do so accurately.
 Users employ about 1-2 liters of water to clear menstrual cups.

Acceptability studies 

In a randomized controlled feasibility study in rural western Kenya, adolescent primary school girls were provided with menstrual cups or menstrual pads instead of traditional menstrual care items of cloth or tissue. Girls provided with menstrual cups had a lower prevalence of sexually transmitted infections than control groups. Also, the prevalence of bacterial vaginosis was lower among cup users compared with menstrual pad users or those continuing other usual practice.

Access to water and hygiene 

 Cleaning a menstrual cup in a public toilet can pose problems as the handwashing sinks are often in a public space rather than in the toilet cubicle. Some manufacturers suggest wiping out the cup with a clean tissue and cleaning the cup at the next private opportunity. The user could also carry a small bottle of water to rinse the cup privately over the toilet. Another option is to use wet wipes. Since menstrual cups only need to be emptied after half a day or less often (unless the flow is very heavy) many users do not have to empty them in public toilets, but rather wait until they return home.
 A lack of clean water and soap for handwashing, needed before inserting the cup, presents a problem to women in developing countries. Insertion requires thorough washing of the cup and hands to avoid introducing new bacteria into the vagina, which may heighten the risk of UTIs and other infections. Disposable and reusable pads do not demand the same hand hygiene, though reusable pads also require access to water for washing out pads.
 Because menstrual cups require boiling once a month, this can be a problem in developing countries if there is a lack of water, firewood, and good hygiene practices. Other options currently in use, such as rags that are washed, may be less hygienic.
 Removing a menstrual cup can be messy. Sometimes menstrual blood can spill during removal, although many women remove the device while hovering over a toilet to catch such spillage.

When using a urine-diverting dry toilet, menstrual blood can be emptied into the part that receives the feces. If any menstrual blood falls into the funnel for urine, it can be rinsed away with water.

Leakage 
Menstrual cups collect menstrual fluid inside the vagina and generally do not leak (if emptied often enough and inserted properly). Some women experience leakage due to improper use or cup size. For example, a menstrual cup may leak if it is not inserted correctly and does not pop open completely and seal against the walls of the vagina. Some factors mentioned in association with leakage included menorrhagia, unusual anatomy of the uterus, need for a larger size of menstrual cup, and incorrect placement of the menstrual cup, or that it had filled to capacity. However, a proper seal may continue to contain fluid in the upper vagina even if the cup is full.

The frequency of reported leakage for menstrual cups is similar or lower than for tampons and pads.

Safety
Menstrual cups are safe when used as directed and no health risks related to their use have been found.

No medical research was conducted to ensure that menstrual cups were safe prior to introduction on the market. Early research in 1962 evaluated 50 women using a bell-shaped cup. The researchers obtained vaginal smears, gram stains, and basic aerobic cultures of vaginal secretions. Vaginal speculum examination was performed, and pH was measured. No significant changes were noted. This report was the first containing extensive information on the safety and acceptability of a widely used menstrual cup that included both preclinical and clinical testing and over 10 years of post-marketing surveillance.

One case report noted the development of endometriosis and adenomyosis in one menstrual cup user. Additionally, one survey with a small sample size indicated a possible link. Therefore, two organizations have issued a combined statement that urged further research. However, the U.S. Food and Drug Administration declined to remove menstrual cups from the market, saying that there was insufficient evidence of risk.

No differences in the growth of Staphylococcus aureus or health harms were identified among school girls provided with menstrual cups compared to those using menstrual pads, or continuing their usual practice in rural western Kenya.

Menstrual cups can be used with an IUD; however, there is an unclear association with respect to IUD expulsion.

Toxic shock syndrome
Toxic shock syndrome (TSS) is a potentially fatal bacterial illness. Scientists have recognized an association between TSS and tampon use, although the exact connection remains unclear. TSS caused by menstrual cup use appears to be very rare. The probable reason for this is that menstrual cups are not absorbent, do not irritate the vaginal mucosal tissue, and so do not change the vaginal flora in any measurable amount. 

Research has shown that the cup has no impact on the vaginal flora, which means there is no effect on the presence of S. aureus, the bacterium that can cause TSS. The risk of TSS associated with cervical caps used for contraception in the female barrier method is also very low. Cervical caps and menstrual cups both use mostly medical grade silicone or latex.

A widely reported study showed that in vitro, bacteria associated with toxic shock syndrome (TSS) are capable of growing on menstrual cups.

A 2019 review found the risk of toxic shock syndrome with menstrual cup use to be low, with five cases identified via their literature search. Data from the United States showed rates of TSS to be lower in women using menstrual cups versus high-absorbency tampons. Infection risk is similar or less with menstrual cups compared to pads or tampons.

Types
Menstrual cups are generally bell-shaped, with a few exceptions. Most brands use medical grade silicone as the material for the menstrual cup, although latex and thermoplastic elastomer are also options. Menstrual cups made from silicone are generally designed to last for 1–5 years.

The majority of menstrual cups on the market are reusable, rather than disposable.

Size, shape, and flexibility

Most menstrual cup brands sell a smaller and a larger size. The smaller size is typically recommended for women under 30 or women who have not given birth vaginally. The larger size is typically recommended for women over 30 or have given birth vaginally, or have a heavy flow. However, there have been no studies that show any need for a different sized cup base on age or parity. Cups with even smaller sizes are recommended for teenagers, as well as women and girls who are more physically fit, as those with stronger pelvic floor muscles may find a larger cup uncomfortable. If the cervix sits particularly low or is tilted, a shorter cup may be more suitable. Capacity is important for women who have a heavier flow. Menstrual cup capacity varies by size. Approximately, small size cups hold 15-25 ml, medium size cups hold 20-30 ml, and large cups hold 30-40 ml.

Menstrual cups also vary by firmness or flexibility. Some companies offer a range of firmness levels in their cups. A firmer cup pops open more easily after insertion and may hold a more consistent seal against the vaginal wall (preventing leaks), but some women find softer cups more comfortable to insert.

Color
The silicone of which most brands of cups are produced is naturally colorless and translucent. Several brands offer colored cups as well as, or instead of the colorless ones. Translucent cups lose their initial appearance faster than colored – they tend to get yellowish stains with use. The shade of a colored cup may change over time, though stains are often not as obvious on colored cups. Stains on any color of the cup can often be removed or at least lightened by soaking the cup in diluted hydrogen peroxide and/or leaving it out in the sun for a few hours.

Most cups produced do not have any other additives to them, except for the colored cups. The coloring used is reported to be safe and approved by the FDA for medical use and food coloring.

Similar devices 

Menstrual discs (also called cervical cups) are disc-shaped, like a diaphragm, with a flexible outer ring and a soft, collapsible center. They collect menstrual fluid like menstrual cups, but stay in place by hooking behind the pubic bone instead of relying on suction. Menstrual discs come in both disposable and reusable varieties.

Cost
The costs for menstrual cups vary widely, from US$0.7 to $47 per cup (based on a 2019 review of 199 brands of menstrual cups available in 99 countries).

Reusable menstrual products (including menstrual cups, but not disposable menstrual cups) are more economical than disposable products. Money will be saved using a menstrual cup, compared with other options such as tampons. If a woman menstruates for 40 years, the lifetime expense for pads and tampons is US$2,400. If the average silicone menstrual cup lasts between one and five years, then between eight and 40 would be needed in 40 years. If a menstrual cup costs US$30 (costs vary by manufacturer), the lifetime cost for a menstrual cup would be between US$240 and US$1,200.

The up-front cost of a menstrual cup may be expensive for women from low-income households, especially in developing countries. Buying pads or using rags monthly may seem more affordable than purchasing a menstrual cup, though the lifetime cost is higher.

Environmental impact
Since they are reusable, menstrual cups help to reduce solid waste. Some disposable menstrual pads and plastic tampon applicators can take 25 years to break down in the ocean and can cause a significant environmental impact. Biodegradable sanitary options are also available, and these decompose in a short period of time, but they must be composted, and not disposed of in a landfill.

When considering a 10-year time period, waste from consistent use of a menstrual cup is only a small fraction of the waste of pads or tampons. For example, if compared with using 12 pads per period, use of a menstrual cup would produce only 0.4% of the plastic waste.

Each year, an estimated 20 billion pads and tampons are discarded in North America. They typically end up in landfills or are incinerated, which can have a great impact on the environment. Most of the pads and tampons are made of cotton and plastic. Plastic takes about 50 or more years and cotton starts degrading after 90 days if it is composted.

Given that the menstrual cup is reusable, its use greatly decreases the amount of waste generated from menstrual cycles, as there is no daily waste and the amount of discarded packaging decreases as well. After their life span is over, the silicone cups are put in landfills or incinerated.

Menstrual cups may be emptied into a small hole in the soil or in compost piles, since menstrual fluid is a valuable fertilizer for plants and any pathogens of sexually transmitted diseases will quickly be destroyed by soil microbes. The water used to rinse the cups can be disposed of in the same way. This reduces the amount of wastewater that needs to be treated.

In developing countries, solid waste management is often lacking. Here, menstrual cups have an advantage over disposable pads or tampons as they do not contribute to the solid waste issues in the communities or generate embarrassing refuse that others may see.

History 
Menstrual cups may have been inspired by other types of vaginal inserts used throughout history. Vaginal inserts had various purposes from birth control, enabling abortions, to supporting a prolapsed uterus. The first version of what we would now call a menstrual cup was a rubber sack attached to a rubber ring created by S.L. Hockert in 1867, which was patented in the United States. An early version of a bullet-shaped menstrual cup was patented in 1932, by the midwifery group of McGlasson and Perkins. Leona Chalmers patented the first usable commercial cup in 1937. Other menstrual cups were patented in 1935, 1937, and 1950. The Tassaway brand of menstrual cups was introduced in the 1960s, but it was not a commercial success. Early menstrual cups were made of rubber.

In 1987, another latex rubber menstrual cup, The Keeper, was manufactured in the United States. This proved to be the first commercially viable menstrual cup and it is still available today. The first silicone menstrual cup was the UK-manufactured Mooncup in 2001. Most menstrual cups are now manufactured from medical grade silicone because of its durability and hypoallergenic properties, though there are also brands made of TPE (thermoplastic elastomer). Menstrual cups are becoming more popular worldwide, with many different brands, shapes, and sizes on the market. Most are reusable, though there is at least one brand of disposable menstrual cups currently manufactured.

Some non-governmental organizations (NGOs) and companies have begun to propose menstrual cups to females in developing countries since about 2010, for example in Kenya and South Africa. Menstrual cups are regarded as a low-cost and environmentally friendly alternative to sanitary cloth, expensive disposable pads, or "nothing" – the reality for many females in developing countries.

While numerous companies all over the world offer this product it was still not well known in around 2010. It may be difficult for companies to make profit from this product as one single menstrual cup can last a girl or woman five years or longer. Most women hear of menstrual cups through the internet or word of mouth, rather than through conventional advertising on TV for example.

Society and culture

Developing countries 

Menstrual cups can be useful as a means of menstrual hygiene management for women in developing countries where access to affordable sanitary products may be limited. A lack of affordable hygiene products means inadequate, unhygienic alternatives are often used, which can present a serious health risk. Menstrual cups offer a long-term solution compared to some other feminine hygiene products because they do not need to be replaced monthly.

The municipality of Alappuzha in Kerala, India launched a project in 2019 and gave away 5,000 menstrual cups for free to female residents. The purpose of this was to encourage the use of these cups instead of non-biodegradable menstrual pads to reduce waste production. In 2022, Kumbalangi, a village in Kerala, became India's first sanitary napkin free panchayat under a project called "Avalkkayi", which gave away 5,700 menstrual cups for free.

Cultural aspects 

Feminine hygiene products that need to be inserted into the vagina can be unacceptable for cultural reasons. There are myths that they interfere with female reproductive organs and that they cause females to lose their virginity. Use of a menstrual cup could stretch or break the hymen. Since some cultures value the preservation of the hymen as evidence of virginity, this can discourage young women from using cups.

See also 
Cervical cap
Diaphragm (contraceptive)
Menstrual Hygiene Day
Period panties

References 

Feminine hygiene
Menstrual cycle
Personal hygiene products